Sajeela Leghari is a Pakistani politician who had been a Member of the Provincial Assembly of Sindh, from June 2013 to May 2018. Previously, she had been a Member of the Provincial Assembly of Sindh from 2006 to 2007 and again from 2008 to 2013.

Early life and education
She was born on 29 March 1964 in Dadu.

She earned the degree of Bachelor of Medicine and Bachelor of Surgery from Liaquat University of Medical and Health Sciences.

Political career
She was elected to the Provincial Assembly of Sindh as a candidate of Pakistan Muslim League (Q) (PML-Q) from Constituency PS-75 (Dadu-V) in September 2006.

She was re-elected to the Provincial Assembly of Sindh as a candidate of PML-Q on a reserved seat for women in 2008 Pakistani general election.

She was re-elected to the Provincial Assembly of Sindh as a candidate of Pakistan Peoples Party (PPP) on a reserved seat for women in 2013 Pakistani general election.

She was re-elected to the Provincial Assembly of Sindh as a candidate of PPP on a reserved seat for women in 2018 Pakistani general election.

References

Living people
Sindh MPAs 2013–2018
1964 births
Pakistan People's Party MPAs (Sindh)
Sindh MPAs 2008–2013